Mordechai Surkis (21 January 1908 – 26 May 1995) was an Israeli politician who was the first mayor of Kfar Saba, as well as serving as a member of the Knesset for Rafi and its successors between 1965 and 1974.

Biography
Born in Stanyslaviv in Austria-Hungary (today Ivano-Frankivsk in Ukraine, from 1919 to 1939 in Poland), Surkis made aliyah to Mandatory Palestine in 1933. He became a member of the Haganah, and during World War II, served in the Jewish Brigade.

In 1951 he became head of Kfar Saba local council. Under his leadership Kfar Saba was declared a city and he became the city's first mayor in 1962, a position he held until 1965. Between 1959 and 1965 he also chaired the Local Government Association. A member of the Mapai central committee, he joined Rafi in 1965 when it was formed by a group of breakaway Mapai members headed by David Ben-Gurion. Later in the year he was elected to the Knesset on the Rafi list. He retained his seat in the 1969 elections, by which time Rafi had merged into the Alignment, but lost his seat in the 1973 elections.

He died in 1995 at the age of 87.

References

External links

1908 births
1995 deaths
Alignment (Israel) politicians
British Army personnel of World War II
Haganah members
Israeli Labor Party politicians
Israeli people of Polish-Jewish descent
Jewish Israeli politicians
Jews from Galicia (Eastern Europe)
Jews in Mandatory Palestine
Mapai politicians
Mayors of places in Israel
People from Kfar Saba
Members of the 6th Knesset (1965–1969)
Members of the 7th Knesset (1969–1974)
People from Ivano-Frankivsk
Polish emigrants to Mandatory Palestine
Rafi (political party) politicians
Mandatory Palestine military personnel of World War II
Jewish Brigade personnel